Towards Artsakh is an Armenian Entertainment television program. The series premiered on Armenia 1 on September 21, 2014.
Each series of the TV program presents some area of life of today's hospitable Artsakh and reveals its most interesting aspects. What is Artsakh famous for? What has remained in the shadow up today? The program covers these questions as well as refers to the interests of young people and concerns of the older generation.  
Artsakh's legends and true stories are presented through the eyes of eyewitnesses.

External links

 
 Towards Artsakh on Armenia 1

Armenian-language television shows
Nonlinear narrative television series
Public Television Company of Armenia original programming
Nagorno-Karabakh
2010s Armenian television series